Marion M. Graham Collegiate is the only public high school in the north end of Saskatoon, Saskatchewan, Canada serving the Silverwood Heights, Lawson Heights, River Heights, Richmond Heights, and North Park neighbourhoods. Former Prime Minister Jean Chrétien visited Marion M. Graham Collegiate in 1999, Marion M. Graham Collegiate is also known as Marion Graham or Graham or MMGCI

This school has the distinguished honor of having the first French Immersion graduation class in the Saskatoon Public School Division in 1993. Its main focuses are in the arts, and athletics. Marion Graham has a wide range of artistic classes including visual arts, dance, photography, music, design, theatre arts, carving classes, industrial arts and more.

Currently its feeder schools are Brownell School, Lawson Heights School, North Park Wilson School, River Heights School and Silverwood Heights School.

History
Marion M. Graham Collegiate Institute was opened in September 1984 by the Governor General of Canada, Jeanne Sauvé. The school is named after Marion Margaret Graham , an educator who taught in Saskatoon for thirty years and served as a member of the Saskatoon Public School Board from 1967 to 1982. During these years she worked for the development of learning resource centers in Saskatoon public schools, a service that is now available to all students. Graham also volunteered with the Air Cadet Movement, the St. John Ambulance Association, the YMCA, and the United Way.

Principals
Karen Peterson (2019–present)
Doug Njaa (2014–2019)
Dr. Shirley Figley (2010–2014)
Cole J. Kirby (2005–2010)
Mrs. Shammi Rathwell (2002–2005)
Dr. Karen E. Dellow (1999–2002)
Dennis A. Ens (1994–1999)
Lindsay W. Fast (1986–1994)
Lorne Glauser (1984–1986)

Sports
Marion M. Graham Collegiate offers the following sports to students.

The following is a list of the championships that Marion M. Graham Collegiate has won throughout its existence.

Arts
Marion M. Graham Collegiate offers the following Arts to students.

Musicals performed by the arts department include Grease (1992), West Side Story (1993), Bye Bye Birdie (1994), Guys and Dolls (1995), South Pacific (1996), Oklahoma (1997), Crazy for You (1998), Anything Goes (1999), Good News (2000), Lady be Good (2001), Footloose (2002), Strike up the Band (2003), Copacabana (2005), Area 51 (2006), Grease (2007), High School Musical (2008), Crazy for You (2009), West Side Story (2010), Guys and Dolls (2011), Beauty and the Beast (2012), Fame (2013), All Shook Up (2014), Aladdin (2015), Anything Goes (2016) and Footloose (2017).

References 

General references

External links

Marion M. Graham Web Site

High schools in Saskatoon
Educational institutions established in 1984
1984 establishments in Saskatchewan